Sir Samuel Grimston, 3rd Baronet (7 January 1643 – October 1700) of Gorhambury House, Hertfordshire was an English politician.

Early life

He was born 7 January 1643.  Grimston was the second and only one of the six sons of Sir Harbottle Grimston, 2nd Baronet, a leading Presbyterian lawyer, who survived him. His mother was Sir Harbottle's first wife, Mary Croke, daughter of Sir George Croke, a Justice of the King's Bench.

Career
He was elected Member of Parliament for St Albans at a by-election in May 1668. He was not returned to the parliament of 1678, but was re-elected in 1679 and 1680. During the reign of James II he remained in private life, being, it is said, much disliked by the king, who expressly excepted him from pardon in the manifesto he issued when he contemplated landing in England (1692).

Grimston succeeded to his father's baronetcy and estates, including Gorhambury, in 1683, and was returned a member of the Convention Parliament of 22 January 1689. From that time till May 1699 he sat continuously for his old borough of St Albans.

Personal life

He married first Lady Elizabeth Finch, the eldest daughter of Heneage Finch, 1st Earl of Nottingham, on 14 February 1670. Before her death in 1672, they were the parents of a daughter:

 Elizabeth Grimston (d. 1694), who became the first wife of William Savile, 2nd Marquess of Halifax (1665–1700) in 1687.

On 17 April 1673, Grimston married his second wife, Lady Anne Tufton, the sixth daughter of John Tufton, 2nd Earl of Thanet and his wife, Lady Margaret Sackville (daughter of Richard Sackville, 3rd Earl of Dorset and Lady Anne Clifford). By her he had a son and daughter, but both died young, and on his death, which occurred in October 1700, the Grimston baronetcy became extinct.

Grimston left the family estates, which he had increased by the purchase of the manor of Windridge from Henry Osbaston, to his great-nephew, William Luckyn Grimston (later the 1st Viscount Grimston), second son of Sir William Luckyn of Messing Hall.

Descendants
Through his daughter Lady Elizabeth, he was a grandfather of Lady Anne Savile (1691–1717), who married Charles Bruce, 4th Earl of Elgin.

Arms

References

 
 
 

1643 births
1700 deaths
18th-century English people
Baronets in the Baronetage of England
English MPs 1661–1679
English MPs 1680–1681
English MPs 1681
English MPs 1689–1690
English MPs 1690–1695
English MPs 1695–1698
English MPs 1698–1700
Samuel
Deputy Lieutenants of Hertfordshire